
Puck County is a unit of territorial administration and local government (powiat) in Pomeranian Voivodeship, northern Poland, on the Baltic coast. The powiat of this name existed  in the history of Poland, since the times of the Polish–Lithuanian Commonwealth up to 1795, and then reintroduced in 1999.

Modern Puck County
The modern Puck County came into being on January 1, 1999, as a result of the Polish local government reforms passed in 1998.

As of 2019 its total population is 85,211, out of which the population of Puck is 11,213, that of Władysławowo is 9,930, that of Hel is 3,267, that of Jastarnia is 2,704, and the rural population is 58,097.

Puck County on a map of the counties of Pomeranian Voivodeship

Puck County is bordered by the city of Gdynia to the south and Wejherowo County to the south-west. It also borders the Bay of Puck to the east and the Baltic Sea to the north.

Administrative division
The county is subdivided into seven gminas (three urban, one urban-rural and three rural). These are listed in the following table, in descending order of population.

Transport

Railway transport 
The railway network in the area of this county consists of two active railway lines, 213 and dismantled 263. The lines intersected in Swarzewo.

The station in Puck was located closest to the sea on the Polish railway network, which is why a temporary harbor with a railway siding was built in Puck. The development of railways in the county in the 1920s caused the development of tourism on Hel Spit. Because of the largely tourist traffic on Hel Spit, line 213 shows high seasonal variability of transports.
Freight traffic, due to the lack of industry, is marginal.

References

 
Kashubia
Puck